Sherrod Emerson Skinner Jr. (October 29, 1929 – October 26, 1952) was a United States Marine Corps officer who sacrificed his life in defense of his outpost and fellow Marines during the First Battle of the Hook in the Korean War. For his actions on October 26, 1952, 1stLt Skinner was posthumously awarded the United States of America's highest military honor – the Medal of Honor.

Biography
Sherrod Emerson Skinner Jr. was born October 29, 1929 in Hartford, Connecticut. He attended grammar school in East Lansing, Michigan. In 1947, he graduated from Milton Academy, Milton, Massachusetts, and entered Harvard University. While at Harvard, he and his twin brother, David, entered the Marine Corps Reserve Platoon Leaders program, serving on active duty during the summers of 1948 and 1949. He was appointed a second lieutenant in the Marine Corps Reserve on October 9, 1951 and ordered to active duty the following day.

In March 1952, after completing the Marine Officers Basic School at Quantico, Virginia, 2ndLt Skinner entered the Battery Officer Course in the Artillery School, Fort Sill, Oklahoma, and completed the artillery course in July 1952. He then trained at Camp Pendleton, California, until he left for Korea.

Second Lieutenant Skinner was a forward artillery observer with the 11th Marines, 1st Marine Division, in a vital forward outpost when it was attacked by the enemy under cover of heavy artillery fire. He continued the defense of the position until ammunition was exhausted and then directed his men to feign death as the enemy overran the position. When a grenade was thrown among the Marines, he threw himself on it, sacrificing his own life to protect his men.

His parents were notified by General Lemuel C. Shepherd Jr., Commandant of the Marine Corps, that their son was the 25th Marine to be awarded the nation's highest decoration since the start of the Korean War. The medal was presented to his parents at the Marine Barracks, Washington, D.C. by then-Vice President Richard Nixon on September 9, 1953.

Second Lieutenant Skinner's remains were returned to Arlington National Cemetery for burial in January 1953.

Decorations

In addition to the Medal of Honor and Purple Heart, 2dLt Skinner was entitled to the Korean Service Medal with one bronze star and the United Nations Service Medal.

Medal of Honor citation
The President of the United States takes pride in presenting the MEDAL OF HONOR posthumously to

for service as set forth in the following citation:

See also

List of Medal of Honor recipients
List of Korean War Medal of Honor recipients

References
Inline

General

1929 births
1952 deaths
American military personnel killed in the Korean War
Burials at Arlington National Cemetery
Harvard University alumni
United States Marine Corps Medal of Honor recipients
Milton Academy alumni
United States Marine Corps officers
United States Marine Corps reservists
Korean War recipients of the Medal of Honor
Military personnel from Connecticut
Deaths by hand grenade
United States Marine Corps personnel of the Korean War